Shae Wilson (born 11 January 1999) is an Australian born, Norfolk Islands international lawn bowler. She has represented the Norfolk Islands at two Commonwealth Games.

In 2018, she competed at the 2018 Commonwealth Games on the Gold Coast, in the women's singles and the women's fours at the Games. Four years later in 2022, she competed in her second Games, at the 2022 Commonwealth Games in Birmingham, in the women's singles and the women's pairs. She finished top of her group in the singles and defeated Laura Daniels (a former world champion) in the quarter finals before losing in the semi finals to the eventual champion Ellen Ryan and then losing the bronze medal play off.

References 

Living people
1999 births
Bowls players at the 2018 Commonwealth Games
Bowls players at the 2022 Commonwealth Games
Norfolk Island sportspeople
Norfolk Island bowls players